This is a list of members of the Bougainville House of Representatives from 2020 to 2025 as elected at the 2020 election.

References

Bougainville House of Representatives